Meridian High School is a public high school located on the north edge of Meridian, Texas (USA) and classified as a 2A school by the UIL. It is part of the Meridian Independent School District located in central Bosque County. In 2015, the school was rated "Met Standard" by the Texas Education Agency.

Athletics
The Meridian Yellow Jackets compete in these sports - 

Baseball
Basketball
Cross Country
Football
Golf
Powerlifting
Softball
Tennis
Track and Field

State Titles
Boys Golf - 
1997(1A)
Boys Track - 
1977(B)
Girls Track - 
1977(B)

State Finalists
Volleyball - 
1968(1A)

References

External links
Meridian ISD

Schools in Bosque County, Texas
Public high schools in Texas
Public middle schools in Texas